Yantai railway station is a railway station located in Zhifu District, Yantai, Shandong, China. It is a terminus for local trains and some high-speed trains. Other high-speed services call at Yantai South railway station instead.

History
The railway station opened in 1958.

Reconstruction of the station began on 6 September 2007 and was completed on 16 May 2009. An official ceremony for the new station took place on 16 August 2009.

References

Railway stations in Shandong
Railway stations in China opened in 1958